Motu One, also known as Bellinghausen, is an atoll in the Leeward group of the Society Islands. Motu One is located 550 km northwest from Tahiti and 72 km northeast of Manuae, its closest neighbor.

Motu One's reef encloses totally a lagoon without a pass. All of its sides are covered with low, wooded sandy islands except for its southern side.  means Sand Island in Tahitian, that is a low-lying, sandy islet that cannot sustain permanent human habitation.

History
The name Atoll Bellinghausen or more rarely Bellingshausen was given to this small atoll by the a Russian officer and navigator of Baltic German descent in the Imperial Russian Navy Otto von Kotzebue in honour of Fabian Gottlieb von Bellingshausen. It should not be confused with Bellingshausen Island, part of the South Sandwich Islands, in the southwest Atlantic.

The atoll was visited by the US Exploring Expedition in Sept. 1839.

Administration
Motu One Atoll is administratively part of the commune (municipality) of Maupiti, itself in the administrative subdivision of the Leeward Islands.

See also
French Polynesia

References

External links
 Atoll list

Atolls of the Society Islands